Derodontus is a genus of tooth-necked fungus beetles in the family Derodontidae. There are about eleven described species in Derodontus.

Species
These eleven species belong to the genus Derodontus:
 Derodontus esotericus Lawrence, 1979
 Derodontus japonicus Hisamatsu, 1964
 Derodontus longiclavis Nikitskiy, 1987
 Derodontus macularis (Fuss, 1850)
 Derodontus maculatus (Melsheimer, 1844)
 Derodontus nepalensis Háva 2009
 Derodontus ossetious Nikitsky, 1993
 Derodontus raffrayi Grouvelle, 1917
 Derodontus trisignatus (Mannerheim, 1852)
 Derodontus tuberosus Hisamatsu & Sakai, 1986
 Derodontus unidentatus Lawrence, 1979

References

Further reading

External links

 

Derodontidae
Articles created by Qbugbot